Rublyovo-Arkhangelskaya line or Line 17 of the Moscow Metro is currently under construction. It began in 2021 and will end after 2028, opening in two phases. Phase 1 is scheduled to be completed by 2028 completing the section from Delevoy Tsentr to Lipovaya Roscha station and phase two is scheduled to open after 2028 expanding the line from Lipovaya Roscha to Ilyinskaya station. In the future it will be connected with Biryulyovskaya line.

Stations

References 

Moscow Metro lines